Leonid "Crazy Leo" Urlichich (born 2 February 1985 in Moscow, USSR) is a Russian-Canadian rally driver currently competing in the Canadian and the US national championships. He drives for a Toronto-based team Can-Jam Motorsports and has expressed ambitions to compete in the World Rally Championship.

Urlichich is notable for winning the second gravel rally he has ever finished.

Career

Early career
At the age of 17 Urlichich enrolled in Trent University in Peterborough, Ontario, where he pursued a Business Administration degree. He first drove competitively while at university, at the local rally cross events in his daily-driven Subaru WRX STi.

2007 marked his first performance rally, Rallye Perce-Neige Maniwaki, held in Quebec.

2008-2010
2008 Black Bear rally earned Urlichich his first ever performance rally victory. Urlichich and co-driver Dave Shindle won the event after setting the fastest times on all but the last stage against more experienced Peter Thomson and Andrew Comrie-Picard.

The 2010 season was Urlichich's full season in the Canadian Rally Championship. Rally Baie-des-Chaleurs delivered his first national podium, as he finished second. Urlichich finished fifth overall in the 2010 Canadian Rally Championship.

2011
2011 season saw Urlichich team up with an Irish co-driver Martin Brady. The team has competed in eight events across Canada. Urlichich lost Rallye de Charlevoix to Antoine L'Estage and John Buffum (who was co-driving at this event) by one second. At the end of the season Urlichich and Brady won Rally of the Tall Pines and finished second in the Championship. David Higgins, who finished second in the event noted that the rally was one of the most difficult in his career due to the nature of stages.

2012
2012 was Urlichich's inaugural season in the Rally America championship in the United States. Partnered with an experienced Welsh co-driver Carl Williamson, Urlichich has won a stage at the debut Sno*Drift rally and finished the event third, later to be penalized to sixth place due to the substrate of the catalytic converter missing. At the second rally of the year Urlichich crashed heavily into a telegraph pole, but despite serious damage to his car, he was able to finish second overall. The video of the accident went viral on YouTube getting over 1.4 million views.

Urlichich and Williamson finished second in the Canadian Championship, second in the North American Rally Cup, and fifth in the Rally America National Championship.

2013
Urlichich was absent from full-time competition in 2013, spending time in Europe working on a program to compete in one of the Support Categories of the World Rally Championship in 2014.

2014
Debut season in the WRC, in the high profile ‘Drive DMACK Fiesta Trophy’.

2016
Champion, Class Four, MLRC Rallycross Championship

2017
Canadian Rally Champion (P4WD)

2018
1st P4WD, Rallye Perce-Neige

2019
Canadian Rally Champion (P4WD)

1st P4WD, Rallye Perce-Neige

1st Overall, Rally of the Tall Pines

Co-drivers and pacenotes
Over the years Urlichich has competed with nine different co-drivers, including a Welsh co-driver Carl Williamson, who has co-driven for Jari-Matti Latvala in the Stobart Ford World Rally Team.

Urlichich has claimed on multiple occasions that he recognizes the importance of Pacenotes in modern rallying. According to Williamson, Urlichich has developed a "rather unique Pacenote system", which was designed from scratch and uses some Finnish words.

Personality and social media
Urlichich is known for his passion about rallying and his quirky behavior that shows through his interviews. His public persona matches his personality, which has gained Urlichich a sizeable social media following, larger than that of any other rally driver in North America, except Ken Block and Travis Pastrana.

Other disciplines
On July 22 and 23, 2011 Urlichich competed in the Castrol Canadian Touring Car Championship race at the legendary Mosport International Raceway, where he struggled and had to use his skills of driving on dirt during his off track excursions.

Career results

WRC results

Drive DMACK Cup results

References

Further reading

External links
Profile at eWRC-results.com
https://carsrally.ca/competitors/leonid-urlichich/

Russian emigrants to Canada
Canadian rally drivers
1985 births
Living people
Saintéloc Racing drivers
World Rally Championship drivers